The Kháng people are an Austro-Asiatic people of northwestern Vietnam.

Etymology
The Kháng people also called as Haang, Ksakhao, Ksasua, Ksadon, Ksadaeng, Ksahoc, Ksaai, Ksabung, Quanglam, Bren, Ksakautenh, Putheng, Tayhay.

History
Most Khaang live in the Sơn La and Lai Châu provinces of northwestern Vietnam. Khang subgroups include Kháng Dẩng, Kháng Hoặc, Kháng Dón, Kháng Súa, Ma Háng, Bư Háng, Ma Háng Bẻng, and Bư Háng Cọi.

Their cuisine is known for its hot and sour dishes, and they have the custom of drinking by the nose (Khang language: tu mui). They celebrate Xen Pang Ả festival.

In 2019 their population was 16,180.

References 

Trần Hữu Sơn. 2010. Văn hóa dân gian người Kháng ở Tây Bắc. Hà Nội: Nhà xuất bản Đại Học Quốc Gia Hà Nội.

External links
Ethnologue report
http://projekt.ht.lu.se/rwaai RWAAI (Repository and Workspace for Austroasiatic Intangible Heritage)
 http://hdl.handle.net/10050/00-0000-0000-0003-93F5-2@view Khang in RWAAI Digital Archive

Ethnic groups in Vietnam
Ethnic groups in Laos